William Chapman Foster (April 27, 1897 – October 15, 1984) was an American businessman and high-ranking government official. He served as United States Under Secretary of Commerce and United States Deputy Secretary of Defense under President Harry Truman. Later, he served as the first United States Arms Control and Disarmament Agency director, under Presidents John F. Kennedy and Lyndon B. Johnson.

Early life and career
Born in Westfield, New Jersey in 1897, Foster attended the Massachusetts Institute of Technology (MIT), studying chemical engineering. While a senior at MIT, he enlisted in what was then known as the United States Army Air Service and served as a combat pilot in World War I.He told a story of how he got his pilots license when there were no instructors.  He was a sailor, so he knew the wind upon a sail.  An airplane was similar, he said, with the sail horizontal.  The first requirement was that you had to obtain an airplane.  Then as long as you took off and landed without dying, you were awarded a license. VJF reference. In 1918, he entered the workforce as an engineer for various organizations including the Packard Motor Car Company. In 1922, he went into business for himself as the owner of the Pressed & Welded Steel Products Company.

Early government career
Following a successful business career, Foster worked closely with the U.S. government during World War II, serving on the New York City mayors' post-war planning committee and as a member of the Purchase Policy Advisory Committee of the Army Services Forces. In 1944, he took office as Deputy Director of the Purchases Division, Army Service Forces.

In 1946, Averell Harriman, then Secretary of Commerce, picked Foster to be Under Secretary of Commerce, in part to help with rebuilding Europe after the war. When President Harry Truman launched the Marshall Plan for that purpose in 1948, Harriman became the Special Representative of the effort in Europe and Foster became his deputy. Foster was Administrator of the Marshall Plan (formally the Economic Cooperation Administration) for 1950–1951.

In 1951, as the Korean War raged, Truman appointed Foster to be Deputy Secretary of Defense, under Secretary Robert A. Lovett. Foster played a major role in organizing the Defense Department's procurement for the war.

1950s private sector career
Although Foster was a lifelong Republican, he left government when the Eisenhower administration came to office. In 1953, upon deciding to leave his role in the government, Foster accepted the position of President of the prestigious Manufacturing Chemists Association (MCA). During his time there, he proposed a national-level air pollution abatement committee, which eventually led to offices within the government prior to the creation of the Environmental Protection Agency. Foster had long-been a free trade advocate, and eventually left the MCA over its support of tariffs. He served as Executive Vice President and Director of Olin Mathieson Chemical Corporation until 1958, and as Vice President and Senior Advisor of Olin Mathieson until 1961.

Return to public service
In 1961, Foster worked with the Kennedy administration to pass a law creating a new Arms Control and Disarmament Agency, and served as its founding director (1961–1968). Foster not only directed the agency, but also served as one of the key U.S. arms control negotiators. Having established a good working relationship with his Soviet counterparts, he contributed to the Nuclear Test Ban Treaty and the hot-line accord in 1963 and was the lead U.S. negotiator for the 1968 Treaty on the Non-Proliferation of Nuclear Weapons, frequently serving as the U.S. representative to the Eighteen Nation Committee on Disarmament (ENCD). The ACDA under Foster's leadership is widely seen as having been the driving force behind a wide range of disarmament and nonproliferation efforts. Foster left the government again at the end of the Johnson administration.

Later private sector career
On leaving the government, Foster was convinced that the public and the foreign policy elite outside government needed to have a voice in arms control and nonproliferation issues, and worked with others to found the non-government Arms Control Association serving as its founding chairman. He also served on the boards of the Johns Hopkins School of Advanced International Studies and the George C. Marshall Foundation. He died in 1984.

References

External links
Arlington National Cemetery

1897 births
1984 deaths
Truman administration personnel
Kennedy administration personnel
Lyndon B. Johnson administration personnel
United States Under Secretaries of Commerce
United States Deputy Secretaries of Defense
20th-century American diplomats
MIT School of Engineering alumni
20th-century American businesspeople
People from Westfield, New Jersey
New Jersey Republicans
United States Army Air Service pilots of World War I
American company founders
20th-century American engineers